{{Infobox fictional vehicle
| name              = TIE fighter
| series            = Star Wars
| first_major       = Star Wars: From the Adventures of Luke Skywalker (1976 novel)'
| last              = 
| image             = TIEfighter.jpg
| caption           = A pair of standard TIE/LN starfighters
| creator           = Sienar Fleet Systems
Sienar-Jaemus Fleet Systems
| affiliation       = 
| aux_vehicle       =Ejection seat 
| class             = Space superiority fighter
| armaments         = SFS L-s1 laser cannons (2)
| defense           = 
| max_speed         = 
| propulsion        = SFS P-s4 Twin Ion Engines
| chassis           = 
| power             = I-a2b Solar Ionization Reactor
| length            = 7.2 meters (23 ft 9 in)
| width             = 6.7 meters (21 ft 11 in)
| height            = 8.8 meters (28 ft 11 in)
| population_volume = 1 pilot
}}

The Twin Ion Engine (TIE) fighter is a series of fictional starfighters featured in the Star Wars universe. TIE fighters are depicted as fast, agile, yet fragile starfighters produced by Sienar Fleet Systems for the Galactic Empire and by Sienar-Jaemus  Fleet Systems for the First Order and the Sith Eternal. TIE fighters and other TIE craft appear in Star Wars films, television shows, and throughout the Star Wars expanded universe. Several TIE fighter replicas and toys, as well as a TIE flight simulator, have been produced and sold by many companies.

 Origin and design 
Colin Cantwell created the concept model that established the TIE fighter's ball-cockpit and hexagonal panels design for Star Wars (1977). Star Wars creator George Lucas liked the basic design consisting of two panels connected by a stick with a ball-shaped cockpit, but Cantwell's concept had few details. Joe Johnston created additional details, such as the cockpit window and the attachment points between the solar panels and the hull.

Initially given a blue color scheme, the TIE fighter models for the first film were grey to film better against a bluescreen; TIE fighters in The Empire Strikes Back (1980) and Return of the Jedi (1983) shifted back to being a muted blue. Sound designer Ben Burtt created the distinctive sound effect of TIE fighter gunfire by combining an elephant call with a car driving on wet pavement. In the book The Sounds of Star Wars, the engine roar is likened to German Junker Ju 87 "Stuka" bombers, who used sirens to frighten civilians on raids. This could have been a possible inspiration for the sound. Combat scenes between TIE fighters and the Millennium Falcon and Rebel Alliance X-wing fighters in Star Wars were meant to be reminiscent of World War II dogfight footage; editors used World War II air combat clips as placeholders while Industrial Light & Magic completed the movie's special effects. Darth Vader's distinct TIE Advanced x1 in Star Wars was designed to make it instantly recognizable, and the TIE Interceptors featured in Return of the Jedi were designed to look fast, deadly, sleek and frightening.

The Jedi starfighter, created for Revenge of the Sith (2005), was designed to bridge the appearance of the Jedi starfighter in Attack of the Clones (2002) and the TIE fighter design from the original trilogy. The V-wing starfighter, seen at the end of Revenge of the Sith, also makes the distinctive TIE fighter sound when flying by a Star Destroyer. Dark Horse Comics' Sean Cooke designed the TIE predator for Star Wars: Legacy (2006), set 130 years after the events of Star Wars, to appear both reminiscent of and more advanced than the original TIE fighter.

Designers for The Force Awakens (2015) had numerous discussions about how much to "update" the TIE fighter for the first sequel film set 30 years after Return of the Jedi. They retained the starfighter's design but altered its aesthetic to suggest improvements to the vessel's manufacturing process and materials.

 Depiction Star Wars literature states that Grand Moff Tarkin commissioned Sienar Fleet Systems to design and manufacture the Twin Ion Engine line edition (TIE/ln) space superiority starfighter and most TIE variants. Tarkin specified that the TIE had to be fast, maneuverable, energy-efficient, and inexpensive; simply put they are meant to be easily mass-produced and engage in swarm tactics, with the expectation of being expendable assets that would be lost in combat.  To meet these requirements, Sienar incorporated aspects of the V-wing and Jedi interceptor into the new starfighter.

TIE fighters have two hexagonal wings fitted with solar panels which power a twin ion engine (TIE) system that accelerates ionized gases at a substantial fraction of lightspeed along almost any vector, affording the ships tremendous speed and maneuverability albeit with limited fuel reserves. These wings are also structurally sound enough to double as landing gear and feature repulsorlifts for take-off and landing, though TIE fighters are designed to be launched and recovered by cycling storage racks used by Imperial starships and garrisons. The TIE fighter's primary weapons are a pair of laser cannons tied to a secondary generator and mated with an advanced targeting computer which assists the pilot in hitting other fast-moving starfighters.  The fighter does not possess deflector shields, and while its light armoring is proof against small arms and glancing micrometeoroids a direct hit from a laser cannon will destroy it, encouraging pilots to shoot first and make their shots count.  The TIE fighter also lacks a hyperdrive, not only to save on weight and cost but to discourage defection.  Although the TIE fighter's cockpit is pressurized and equipped with oxygen scrubbers to prevent corrosion, it doesn't contain any life-support systems, requiring pilots to wear special flight suits. TIE fighters are equipped with ejection seats, though in older Legends sources there was disagreement on this issue.Star Wars literature also holds that TIE fighter pilots are considered an elite group within the Imperial Navy, relying on their quick reflexes and fearlessness to survive multiple tours of duty.  Training involves hundreds of flight hours learning to coordinate as a team and intense psychological conditioning to put the accomplishment of their mission above other considerations.Windham (2019), p. 120 As such most TIE fighter pilots have a life expectancy of less than a year. TIE fighter pilots wear self-contained flight suits with life-support systems connected to reinforced vacuum-sealed flight helmets.  These helmets feature ship-linked communications and displays.Barr, et al. (2019), p. 271

TIE variants

In addition to the standard TIE/ln fighter (also available as the TIE Light Duty training craft, as seen in the Jump to Lightspeed expansion pack to Star Wars Galaxies), a variety of other TIE craft appear throughout the films. 
In Star Wars film and television
Imperial variants
TIE Advanced x1: Darth Vader flies a TIE Advanced x1 (or just "TIE/x1") in many media, most notably in the original Star Wars during the climatic Death Star battle.  According to background material, the limited-run TIE Advanced x1 was designed to Vader's personal specifications and was only flown by himself and select Imperial pilots.  Compared to the TIE fighter it is faster and more maneuverable with greater structural integrity, equipped with a deflector shield, hyperdrive, reinforced armor-plated hull and improved SFS L-s9.3 laser cannons.  The "bent-wing" configuration was intended to improve energy collection while maintaining the same speed and maneuverability.

TIE/sa bomber: Introduced in The Empire Strikes Back, TIE/sa bombers are seen bombing asteroids in the hunt for the Millennium Falcon.  The design stems from an unused "TIE boarding craft" concept originally developed for A New Hope. The TIE bomber's double-hull design led ILM's modelmakers to dub the ship a "double chili dog" fighter. The TIE/sa, or TIE Surface Assault Bomber, was designed within the Star Wars universe for the Imperial Navy to conduct surgical strikes against targets in space or on planetary surfaces.  It features two cylindrical pods: the starboard-side pod housing the pilot in a pressurized cockpit with a pair of L-s1 laser cannons, and a port-side pod carrying two bomb bays that can launch a variety of ordnance including missiles, bombs and orbital mines.  Its "bent-wing" configuration increased the energy-collection surface area to match the bomber's power requirements while a reinforced hull allowed the bomber survive back-blast during atmospheric bombing.
TIE/sh shuttle: Also featured in The Empire Strikes Back, a TIE/sh shuttle is seen ferrying Captain Needa (Michael Culver) to Darth Vader's Super Star Destroyer.  Like the TIE/sa bomber, this shuttle design stems from an unused "TIE boarding craft" concept developed for A New Hope. Known also within the setting as the TIE Command Shuttle, the craft was based on the TIE/sa bomber but replaced the bombardier pod with a luxurious cabin suitable for Imperial dignitaries and naval officers.  In the event the vessel is attacked, the TIE shuttle carries a pair of laser cannons and deflector shields.

TIE/IN interceptor:  TIE/IN interceptor – faster TIE fighters with dagger-shaped wings in the forward profile of those of the TIE Advanced and four laser cannons – appear at various points in Return of the Jedi. Two scales of TIE interceptor models were used during filming. Their in-universe origin was to meet the Empire's requirement for a fighter superior to the Rebellion's X-wing and Y-wing fleet when it was determined a full production run of the TIE Advanced x1 would be too expensive.  Faster and more maneuverable than a standard TIE fighter, these interceptors are also better armed with wingtip-mounted L-s9.3 laser cannons with the option to carry two more under the cockpit.
TIE Advanced v1: Meant to appear as the prototype precursor to Vader's TIE Advanced x1, the TIE Advanced v1 featured in Star Wars Rebels as craft piloted by the Empire's Inquisitors.  The v1's variable-geometry wings, like Darth Maul's shuttle Scimitar's, were inspired by Ralph McQuarrie's original sketches for the x1.  The fighters' fictional origin is inspired by the Jedi interceptor flown during the Clone Wars, as seen by its heavily-armored wings that fold inward.  With laser cannons and ion engines more powerful than the TIE fighter, the TIE Advanced v1 also features a projectile launcher with a 20 missile magazine, deflector shields and pressurized cockpit. The TIE/v1 debuted in the Rebels Season 1 episode "Empire Day", which featured its maiden flight, but a very similar spacecraft (most likely intended to be the same) was described in the 2014 book Star Wars: Imperial Handbook: A Commander's Guide, which has been confirmed to fall into the Legends continuity, which had by then been decanonized.
TIE/d Defender: The TIE/d Defender made its television debut in Star Wars Rebels, although it first appeared in the 1994 space flight simulator Star Wars: TIE Fighter as player-pilotable craft. In the previous Star Wars Legends continuity, the TIE Defender was originally designed by Admiral Zaarin, who in the 1994 game would betray the Empire and have to be defeated by the player character. Its background was later changed in Star Wars Rebels to being designed personally by Grand Admiral Thrawn.  Classified as a fighter-bomber, its unique tri-wing design gives it better visibility than a TIE interceptor while making it faster than all previous TIE models.  Each wing is equipped with maneuvering jets and a pair of L-s9.3 laser cannons, with another pair and twin projectile launchers fitted on the cockpit pod.  The TIE/d Defender also carries deflector shields and a hyperdrive.
TIE/sk x1 Striker: The TIE/sk x1 experimental air superiority fighter, also known as the TIE Striker, made its first appearance in Rogue One defending the Imperial base on Scarif. Background material on the model describes how it was specifically designed for atmospheric patrols of Imperial ground installations because of the standard TIE fighter's disadvantage in atmospheric combat.  With its more aerodynamic design and specialized repulsorlift engines, the TIE Striker can fly faster than a TIE fighter or X-wing in an atmosphere and is heavily armed with four L-s9.3 laser cannons, two H-s1 heavy laser cannons, and a bomb bay.  Its spacious cockpit can hold a pilot and an optional gunner/bombardier.
TIE/rp Reaper: The TIE/rp Reaper Attack Lander also made its first appearance in Rogue One as support craft with a larger, more angular design that replaces the spherical cockpit found on most TIE fighters. Within the Star Wars universe, these craft were based on the TIE/sk x1 Striker with similar wing configuration but much larger to carry elite Imperial troops into battle.  The TIE/rp Reaper features armor plating, deflector shields and electronic countermeasures to ensure it can survive hostile airspace to deliver its cargo.  It also carries a hyperdrive for faster-than-light travel and a pair of L-s9.3 laser cannons.
TIE Boarding Craft: The TIE Boarding Craft made its theatrical appearance in Rogue One.  The design was originally set to appear in the original Star Wars but was cut from the film and used as inspiration for the TIE bomber and TIE shuttle.  Background literature states that the TIE Boarding Craft shared many of the same features as the TIE bomber but with seating for twelve passengers and a boarding hatch equipped with laser cutters.  Other equipment included deflector shields, twin L-s1 laser cannons, twin H-s1 heavy laser cannons and missile launcher.
TIE reinforcement battery heavy starfighter: The TIE/rb, known also as the TIE Brute, first appeared in Solo: A Star Wars Story chasing the Millennium Falcon during the Kessel Run scene.  Star Wars literature states that the TIE/rb was commissioned to help deal with pirates, smugglers and other outlaws operating in the Outer Rim.  Larger than a standard TIE fighter, the TIE/rb features heavier armor plating and carries a pair of H-s9.3 laser cannons – nearly twice as powerful as a TIE fighter's cannons – on a separate artillery pod.  Because it was sluggish to fly, the TIE Brute features an integrated droid intelligence to assist the pilot.
TIE Crawler: Also known as the Century Tank or the TIE Tank, the vehicle was a tank resembling a TIE fighter but equipped with treaded tracks.
Outland TIE fighter: The TIE Boarding Craft made its television appearance in The Mandalorian. Otherwise congruent to the appearance of a standard TIE fighter, the Outland TIE fighter's wings folded when landing on a levelled surface, dissimilar to that of an X-wing in an open position. In addition, landing gears were concealed inside the bottom of the cockpit to allow for ease of use and stability. The personal starfighter of Moff Gideon, flown by the Moff himself, was used by his Imperial remnant during the New Republic Era, though the Mandalorian bounty hunter Din Djarin took down the starfighter.

First Order variants
TIE/fo space superiority fighter: The Force Awakens features the First Order TIE/fo space superiority fighter, which is superficially similar to the Empire's original TIE fighter but with several technological upgrades.  Built by Sienar-Jaemus Fleet Systems, it features superior firepower, speed and maneuverability with a pair of SJSF L-s9.6 laser cannons and twin SJFS P-s6 ion engines aided by superior solar cell wings and higher-capacity energy converters.  Perhaps the biggest difference is the fact that the TIE/fo features deflector shields – a recognition by the First Order that compared to the Galactic Empire it must take measures to safeguard its more limited supply of pilots.
TIE/sf space superiority fighter: Also featured in The Force Awakens is the TIE/sf fighter, one of which is stolen by Poe Dameron (Oscar Isaac) and Finn (John Boyega) as they escape the First Order.  Piloted by members of the First Order Special Forces, this model is superior to the First Order's TIE/fo.  It is equipped with a hyperdrive, superior shielding, twin ion reactors, a pair of forward-facing L-s9.6 laser cannons, an aft Lb-14 dual heavy laser turret with full 360-degree rotation, and a missile/mag-pulse launcher.
TIE/ba interceptor:  First appearing in Star Wars Resistance, the TIE/ba interceptor is a model of TIE interceptor deployed by the First Order. One ship was used by Major Elrik Vonreg during the late-New Republic era in his encounters with the New Republic and the Resistance. 
TIE silencer:  First appearing in Star Wars: The Last Jedi, the TIE/vn Silencer is the Interceptor-winged personal starfighter of Kylo Ren.
TIE whisper: Kylo Ren flies a custom-model TIE/wi fighter in The Rise of Skywalker.

Sith Eternal variants
TIE/dg starfighter: Also known as the Sith TIE fighter, the TIE Dagger featured in The Rise of Skywalker as a red triangular-wing model of TIE fighter forged in secret for forces operating under the reborn Darth Sidious.

In Star Wars Legends continuity
A number of different TIE designs made their appearance in what is now considered Star Wars Legends, a separate continuity that was split off after Disney acquired the Star Wars franchise.  The TIE/sa was the inspiration for the triple-hulled TIE lander, featured in Star Wars No. 60 and in Star Wars: Complete Locations. Red-modified TIE interceptors are also used by the Emperor's Royal Guards, as featured in Rage of the Wookiees, another expansion of Star Wars Galaxies.

Additionally, LucasArts Star Wars video games introduce several TIE variants, such as the TIE Hunter starfighter in Rogue Squadron III and the TIE Mauler surface vehicle in Empire at War. The TIE/ad fighter  (nicknamed "TIE Advanced" or "Avenger" in-game and derived from Vader's TIE Advanced x1 fighter) and TIE/D Defender — heavily upgraded derivatives of previous craft seen in the Star Wars universe — first appear in TIE Fighter as player-pilotable craft. The plot of Rebel Assault II revolves around destroying the Empire's ability to manufacture the cloaking TIE Phantom starfighter, and a campaign in X-Wing Alliance centers on destroying experimental remote-controlled TIE fighters.Star Wars literature also introduces TIE varieties. TIE raptors attack Rogue Squadron in Solo Command. TYE wings – TIE fighter and Y-wing hybrids – appear both in I, Jedi and Rogue Squadron: Masquerade. Dark Horse's Dark Empire introduces both the droid-piloted TIE/D and the TIE crawler "century tank". West End Games' roleplaying sourcebooks introduce varieties that include the TIE/fc fire-control support ship, the TIE/gt ground-attack fighter, the TIE/rc reconnaissance vessel, and the TIE scout.

 Cultural impact 
A TIE fighter model used in filming the climax of Star Wars sold at auction for $350,000, and another TIE fighter from the film sold at auction for $402,500. Fans built a 16-foot-by-20-foot, 1,000-pound TIE fighter float to commemorate Star Wars' thirtieth anniversary as part of the 2007 Gala Parade in Crystal Lake, Illinois. A Wired editor's creation of a TIE fighter model out of Starbucks cups and stirrers prompted the magazine to create a contest for its readers to submit their own art out of similar Starbucks material. io9 mocked the variety of TIE fighters in the franchise, listing four TIE models on its list of the eleven "silliest" Star Wars ships.

Kenner released TIE fighter and TIE interceptor toys during the original Star Wars trilogy's theatrical release, and Kenner's die-cast TIE bomber is a rare collector's item. Hasbro also released TIE fighter, TIE bomber, and TIE interceptor toys. Both Kenner and Hasbro also manufactured TIE fighter pilot action figures. Lego manufactured TIE fighter, TIE bomber, TIE interceptor, TIE defender, and TIE advanced models. Decipher and Wizards of the Coast published various TIE starfighter and TIE-related cards for the Star Wars Customizable Card Game and Star Wars Trading Card Game, respectively. In 2012, Fantasy Flight Games released Star Wars: X-Wing Miniatures Game, a miniatures game with pre-painted and to scale miniature X-wings and TIE fighters. In 1994, LucasArts released the TIE Fighter flight simulator, which casts the player as an Imperial pilot flying a variety of TIE starfighters. TIE starfighters and their variants are also playable in third- or first-person perspectives in several Star Wars'' titles.

In 2018, a number of Star Wars starfighters had their aerodynamic abilities tested using the Autodesk Flow Design virtual wind tunnel program.  Of those studied, the TIE Fighter scored the worst with a drag coefficient of .98, which is only slightly better than a brick.  Of the other TIE variants tested, the TIE interceptor was slightly better with a coefficient of .78, while the TIE Striker had the best at .48, though this did not compare favorably to the .02 drag coefficient of an F-4E Phantom.  These poor results were rationalized with the in-universe explanations that drag coefficient plays no role in space travel, and that Star Wars fighters can use repulsorlifts and deflector shields to give themselves better flight profiles.

References

External links
 
 

Star Wars spacecraft
Fictional elements introduced in 1977